{{Routemap|inline= |title =Route of S3|| title-color=black| title-bg = Yellow|footnote=Source: German railway atlas|map=
LDER\KS+BHFa~~0.0~~\S+BHF~~4.0~~ 
\SHST~~5.7~~
\S+BHF~~7.1~~Mülheim (Ruhr) Hbf 
\SHST~~13.6~~Essen-Frohnhausen 
\S+BHF~~14.7~~Essen West 
LDER\S+BHF~~17.1~~ 
\S+BHF~~21.8~~Essen-Steele 
\SHST~~22.9~~Essen-Steele Ost 
\SHST~~24.7~~Essen-Horst
\SHST~~27.6~~
\SHST~~31.9~~Hattingen (Ruhr)
\KSHSTe~~33.1~~Hattingen (Ruhr) Mitte}}Line S3''' is a S-Bahn in the Rhein-Ruhr network. It runs from Oberhausen over Essen to  Hattingen Mitte. It is operated at 30-minute intervals, using Stadler FLIRT 3XL units.

Line S 3 mainly runs over three lines built or acquired by the Bergisch-Märkische Railway Company:
 from Oberhausen Hauptbahnhof to Essen-Steele Ost over the Witten/Dortmund–Oberhausen/Duisburg railway, opened in 1862,
 from Essen-Steele Ost to Bochum-Dahlhausen over the Essen-Überruhr–Bochum-Langendreer railway, which was a former coal railway that was converted to standard gauge in 1865 and taken over by the Bergisch-Märkische Railway in 1870,
 from Bochum-Dahlhausen to Hattingen over the Ruhr Valley Railway, opened in 1869.

Its last 1.2 km to Hattingen Mitte runs over the Wuppertal-Wichlinghausen–Hattingen railway opened by the Prussian state railways in 1884 and a short section of line opened by Deutsche Bundesbahn in 1987, including a 100 metre long tunnel.

S-Bahn services commenced between Oberhausen and Hattingen on 26 May 1974. Services were extended from Hattingen to Hattingen Mitte on 3 July 1987.

References

 
S03
1974 establishments in West Germany